Father absence occurs when parents separate and the father no longer lives with his children. Parental separation has been proven to affect a child's development and behaviour. Early parental divorce (during primary school) has been associated with greater internalising and externalising behaviours in the child, while divorce later in childhood or adolescence may dampen academic performance.

Whilst father absence mainly results from parental divorce and separation, including parental alienation, other factors such as family poverty and developmental difficulties have been associated with father absence, the effects of which have been explained by various theoretical approaches.

Difficulties associated with father absence

General problems 
Despite limited agreement among researchers regarding the exact significance of fathering, fathers are traditionally deemed a provider of protection and support for the child's development. Through a number of pathways, father absence may influence child behaviour, especially in early and middle childhood. Father absence often results in a decline in household income, and ineffective parenting arising from continued conflicts between parents and psychological distress in the aftermath of the separation.

Effect on children of an absent parent following divorce 
Research has shown that children who have experienced parental separation in early life often face developmental and behavioural difficulties through their childhood. For example, the separation of parents/guardians impacts children's relationship with their parents, their education, their health, and their wellbeing (Amato, 2000).  Many of the studies that have shown the negative effects of father absence on children have not taken into account other factors that potentially contribute such as the child's characteristics and relationship with the parents before the separation, the child's gender, and the family environment before the separation.

Behavioural and mental health difficulties 
In regard to the effects of father absence, a recent British study assessed child problem behaviour in over 15,000 families using the clinical cut-offs of the Strengths and Difficulties Questionnaire (SDQ), controlling for household factors such as resources, parental mental health and inter-parental relationship. The study found that father absence at a given age, similar to poverty and parental psychological distress, predicted a high probability of the child scoring above the cut-off score for total difficulties two years later. Likewise, father absence predicted several specific difficulties including borderline personality disorder, severe hyperactivity and abnormal emotional problems. Reciprocally, a child's severe externalising and social during their preschool years were also associated with a greater probability of the father being absent two years later. The authors concluded that father absence seemed to be more of a cause than a consequence of child problem behaviour.

Through direct interaction, fathers' involvement in children's development has a positive influence on their social, behavioural and psychological outcomes. In general, engagement of a fatherly figure reduces the frequency of behavioural problems and delinquency in sons and psychological problems in daughters, all the while facilitating children's cognitive development.

Theoretical approaches

Evolutionary approach 
Evolutionary life-history theory postulates that women may invest more in their offspring than men due to a slower rate of reproduction in females. Some theorists add that the assured maternal relatedness to one's offspring may also make women invest more than men. This is because some men may have variable paternity confidence that the child is his offspring.

Psychodynamic approach 
The psychodynamic approach posits that behaviour is motivated by basic needs and drives and is sometimes shaped by unconscious childhood experiences. The psychodynamic approach suggests that for a child to develop a "normal" gender identity, they will have to be raised in a conventional family where there is a father and a mother. Freud believed that being parented by a single mother could confuse the child's identity or lead them to become homosexual. Father absence may hinder the son's acquisition of the traditional masculine role, as he is not able to model his own behaviour and attitude on his fathers'. Along similar lines, sons with absent fathers could have confused gender identities – if the son was separated from his father by age four, he would be less assertive, less involved in sport, less masculine than other boys and more dependent on his peers. Nevertheless, findings of certain empirical studies on psychosexual gender identification have been deemed contradictory and inconclusive. A number of studies have highlighted such negative consequences of the two-parent heterosexual household on children. Contrarily, others have pointed out that being reared in lesbian and single-parent households where the father was absent did not affect the psychosexual development of children, despite higher aggressiveness and submissiveness and lower assertiveness.

Biological approach 
Genes and hormones may account for the tendency of fathers to be absent. Certain DNA patterns have been shown to affect an individual's degree of fidelity and investment in their offspring. In particular, a study in prairie voles indicates that the gene AVPR1A affects the activity of vasopressin receptors in brain regions and thus predicts less cheating on their partners. Similar to oxytocin, the hormone vasopressin can facilitate trust, empathy and social bonding. Injection of vasopressin in polygamous montane voles significantly increased their likelihood of becoming monogamous. This may in turn decrease their likelihood of being an absent father.

A meta-analysis based on 56 twin and adoption studies totalling over 200,000 families has revealed that genetic makeup significantly affects the individual's parenting behaviour. Genes in the father's reliability predict up to 40% of his positive or negative emotions towards his children. In this sense, genes contribute to a father's liking or repulsion for his children, the latter of which may result in the father's absence. However, genes are not the sole predictors of whether a father will like or dislike his child.

Gender differences 
There is mixed empirical evidence on the relative impact of father absence on the development of male and female offspring. A recent study in rural Ethiopia, where father absence could mean a significant decrease in household income, revealed a considerable difference between the wellbeing of male and female offspring. In particular, the author found that a male infant's risk of dying per month was doubled if the biological father was absent – a 30% greater risk than that for females. For female infants, father absence (as opposed to presence) was associated with a lower risk of dying, as well as higher nutritional status. That is to say, father absence was only a statistical predictor of infant death only for male infants. Such a gender difference has been observed despite a strong cultural preference for sons in the area. On the other hand, in developed countries such as the United Kingdom, where father absence may not inflict as much harm on the family's income, the effects of father absence are not noticeably gendered. This suggests that other factors, such as household income and cultural norms, are significant in the wellbeing and development of a child.

Psychological impact on men 
When a young man matures without their biological male role model, this can result in violent reactions to stress and emotions, resistance and hate towards authority, aggression, early rates of sexual encounters,  transferences of the mother's negative talk about the father, and pressured ideologies to become the breadwinner.

Psychological impact on women 
Commonly agreed across authors within the literature on Fatherhood is the idea that "[a] girl's relationship with her father serves as the model for all her relationships with men in her life, romantic and otherwise." Many studies conducted produce the same result: that the absence of a father in a daughter's life can lead to increased promiscuity and sexualised activity. One such study was conducted by Ellis et al., "Does Father Absence Place Daughters at Special Risk for Early Sexual Activity and Teenage Pregnancy?" Ellis provides a greater focus on the timing of the father's absence in their daughter's life but still the results of promiscuity prove contingent on the father being present. From here, researchers have identified a commonality of 5 factors that work to explain how fatherlessness affects development in women, psychologically.

Five-factors approach 
"Un-Factor", where first ideas of being "unworthy" or "unlovable" get developed in young women. They begin to believe these things, creating a self-fulfilled prophecy where they believe they are unworthy and thus only accept and attract love from men who affirm their own feelings of unworthiness.
"Triple Fears Factor", where the three commonly identified fears, also known as abandoned child syndrome, shows fears of rejection, fears of abandonment, and fears of commitment. Each fear is initially identifiable in the early stages of life without a father. The fatherless woman can not help but know the pain of being left. The absence of a father can leave a woman feeling abandoned and "not good enough", bereaved uncertainty around what it means to be committed and received vs. rejected. Being abandoned "feels familiar and 'right' ... and yet, I am terrified of being abandoned." Generally, "what these people will do is to play it safe to protect themselves; they will not put themselves in situations that are going to be intimate. They will be highly social, sexual, intellectual, but not intimate."
"Sexual Healing Factor", which is most commonly identified across women of multiple age ranges and cultures for sexual expression, tends to serve as primary indications of fatherlessness in a woman. The Sexual Healing Factor in girls and women is primarily about control. This sexual behaviour exists on a spectrum, ranging from promiscuity to a complete and utter avoidance to intimacy. In both extremes the girl is able to maintain a sense of control, deciding exactly what sex will look like for them.
"Over Factor" is more explicitly defined as overeating or achieving but to the point where it can be identified as obsessive and addictive.
"RAD Factor", which is most commonly expressed as rage, anger, and depression (RAD). These emotions tend to be expressed and identified as contributing to the emotional state of young women with absent fathers.

Statistics

United States 
Based on the 2018 U.S. Census Bureau: out of 11 million single parent households, 80% of them are fatherless, breaking down to 1 in every 4 children born; totaling to a percentage of 81.5%. It did not take into account the 53% of American-Indian and Alaskan-Native as well as the 17% Asian-American and Pacific-Islander children recorded within these single-parent homes.

In 2005, the United States Department of Health and Human Services reported that the average experience of the American teenager includes living in the absence of their father. This leads to multiple negative impacts on youth in which 85% are reported to have behavioral issues (Center for Disease Control); 71% of high school dropouts and teen moms come from fatherless homes, which is 9 times the national average (National Principals Association Report); 85% of all children who show behaviour disorders come from fatherless homes, which is 20 times the national average (Center for Disease Control); 85% of youth in prison come from fatherless homes, which is 20 times the national average; (Fulton County, Georgia, Texas Department of Correction), and 63% of youth suicides are of children who come from fatherless homes, which is 5 times the national average (US Department of Health/Census).

Specific negative impacts  
Early pubertal timing, or precocious puberty, is associated with negative outcomes in both genders. Early maturing girls have been found to be at risk for teenage pregnancy, drinking and weight problems, and giving birth to low birth weight infants. Early maturing boys are at risk for sexual promiscuity and delinquency and testicular and prostate cancer. Individual difference in pubertal timing may be influenced by weight, physical activity and genetics.

Menarche 
Menarche, a central event of female puberty, is associated with father absence. According to the evolutionary explanation, an unstable home environment (e.g. father absence) discourages a long-term mating life history, leading girls to adopt a short-term reproductive strategy, such as early menarche. This is because they perceive resources they have as scarce and, possibly, their lifespan to be shorter, under the influence of father absence. An early menarche can increase the chance of fertility, while other short-term reproductive strategies can diversify the genes inherited in offspring. These could lift up a higher success rate of rearing children to adolescence. Moreover, the stress of father absence prompts girls to develop a variety of internalising disorders, such as bulimia and depression, which may lower the person's metabolism leading to excessive weight gain which  precipitates early menarche. A study shows that there are fewer monitored meals in the father-absent household.

Having meals in the family is arguably more beneficial to children than is eating alone (i.e. solitary eating), as the former lowers the chance of obesity. It has been disputed whether the environmental stress of father absence stimulates weight gain, and thus accelerates early puberty. Likewise, the stress arisen from the absence of mother has been shown to have little influence on the child's body weight. Since mother absence does not predict weight gain in children, it seems that the increase in the child's body weight observed is due to the isolated genetic influence of an absent father, rather than the global environmental stress cause by the absence of either parent. This is possibly because in ancestral times the survival rate of children with mother being absent was extremely low. A specialised mechanism to deal with mother absence has never been developed.

In addition, recent findings seem to regard genes, rather than the environment, as the mechanism underlying the positive correlation between high body mass index and earlier first menarche onset. Androgen receptor gene may predispose a father to impulsive and externalising behaviours (e.g. family abandonment) and his offspring to early puberty. The essentialness of androgen receptor to female fertility and ovary development has been proven by rodent studies.

Sexual behaviour 
Father absence in a household can result in children (of both sexes) having earlier average ages of first sexual intercourse than those raised in father present households. There is also the effect of increased rates of teenage pregnancy. Some evolutionary theories propose that early childhood is vital for encoding information that shapes future reproductive strategies in regulating physical and motivational pathways of sexual behaviour. Conflicting and stressful parental relationships can lead children to believe that resources are limited, people are untrustworthy, and relationships are opportunistic. As they replicate their parents' mating-oriented reproductive behaviour, they tend to have multiple sexual partners and erratic relationships. Children implicitly and explicitly model their sexual attitudes and behaviours on their parents, see engagement in non-marital sex as normative. Father absence can be a byproduct of initial social and economic strain within the household, as violence, lack of educational opportunities, and cumulative life exposure to poverty can increase the likelihood of early sexual endeavours and pregnancy. The timing of first intercourse can be heritable; shorter alleles of the X-linked androgen receptor (AR) gene has been associated with aggression, impulsivity, high number of sexual partners, divorce in males, and earlier ages of physical maturation in females.

Mechanisms to balance father absence

Matrilineal support 
A study in Ethiopia in 2008 found that despite being poorer overall, widowed and divorced women are on average 2.4 kg heavier than women whose children's fathers are present. Widowed and divorced mothers as well as their daughters are reported to have substantially improved nutritional status which could be explained by them having greater access to the mother's relatives (matrilateral kin). Furthermore, proximity to a mother's relatives can dramatically improve female children's height for age, an indicator of good nutrition. Women who return to their village of birth following marital dissolution are seen to benefit from extra matrilateral kin support.

Presence of a stepfather 
In light of certain research, father absence can be disadvantageous; certain evidence suggests stepfather presence does not reduce these disadvantages but in fact has a worsening effect on such issues. For example, the Cinderella effect, which refers to the observation that stepchildren are at a dramatically increased risk of physical abuse and homicide than children living with their biological parents. Although researchers have found a negative relationship between stepmothers and food expenditure, this effect is not observed with stepfathers and their stepchildren. Ellis and Garber (2000) and Ellis (2004) suggest that stepfather presence is a better predictor of age of menarche than father absence, as it indicates lower quality paternal investment. In accordance with their findings, results show that girls raised in families with stepfathers exhibit a significantly earlier age of menarche than girls raised without stepfathers.

Relative to other groups, children with a constantly absent biological father but a stepfather present reported more frequent incidences of sexual intercourse, as well as an earlier onset of sexual behaviour. The mean age of children with their biological father-absent or partially absent is approximately 15. A higher percentage of children with a constantly absent biological father reported having sexual intercourse than those in the partially absent group. Those with a stepfather present and those with a biological father always absent have the earliest first-time experiences of sexual intercourse at on average 15.11 years old, whereas children without a stepfather or their biological father partially absent at the age of 15.38 experience their first encounter of sexual intercourse. The effect of having a partially absent biological father with stepfather absence and the effect of both stepfather or biological father absence is the same. This study indicated that the presence of a stepfather is not compensating for the disadvantages of a biological father being absent. In some situations, it can cause an even bigger negative effect on children.

No agreement upon effective client treatment 
Choice of effective treatment can be greatly varied and thus can be affected by many factors such as age, one's ability to understand and deal with emotionally heavy material, family members involvement and the family and child's priorities and needs. In treating some of the negative effects that young girls may have, transference to a male therapist could help facilitate the opportunity to fill any emotional void created through father absence. On the other hand, simply through the existence of a connection with a consistent and empathetic adult can provide some paternal function, regardless of gender.

See also 

 Deadbeat Father

References 

Human sexuality
Sexuality and society
Sexual orientation and psychology
Family